Hrib pri Fari is a small settlement immediately west of Fara in the Municipality of Kostel in southern Slovenia. The area is part of the traditional region of Lower Carniola and is now included in the Southeast Slovenia Statistical Region.

Name
The name of the settlement was changed from Hrib to Hrib pri Fari in 1953.

References

External links
Hrib pri Fari on Geopedia

Populated places in the Municipality of Kostel